Al-Bani is a village in northern Syria located in the Qalaat al-Madiq Subdistrict of the al-Suqaylabiyah District in Hama Governorate. According to the Syria Central Bureau of Statistics (CBS), al-Bani had a population of 1,328 in the 2004 census. Its inhabitants are predominantly Sunni Muslims.

References

Populated places in al-Suqaylabiyah District